Alessio Lava (born 25 February 1990) is an Italian footballer who plays as a attacker for  Meridien Larciano.

Career

Lava started his career with Italian eighth tier side , helping them earn promotion to the Italian sixth tier within 2 seasons. In 2012, he signed for Vaianese in the Italian sixth tier. In 2013, Lava signed for Italian fifth tier club Rignanese. In 2017, Lava signed for Costa Rican top flight team Liberia, where he made 7 league appearances and scored 1 goal. On 13 August 2017, he debuted for Liberia during a 4–1 win over Guadalupe. On 13 August 2017, Lava scored his first goal for Liberia during a 4–1 win over Guadalupe.

Before the second half of 2017–18, he signed for Curridabat in the Costa Rican second tier. In 2019, Lava signed for Italian fourth tier outfit Nocerina. In 2020, he signed for Lastrigiana in the Italian fifth tier. Before the second half of 2021–22, he signed for Italian sixth tier side Meridien Larciano.

References

External links
 

1990 births
A.S.D. Nocerina 1910 players
Association football forwards
C.S. Uruguay de Coronado players
Eccellenza players
Expatriate footballers in Costa Rica
Italian expatriate footballers
Italian footballers
Liga FPD players
Living people
Municipal Liberia footballers
Promozione players
Segunda División de Costa Rica players
Serie D players